Pedro Leitão Brito (born 6 January 1970), commonly known as Bubista, is a former Cape Verdean footballer, currently manager of Cape Verde.

Club career
In 1995, Bubista joined Spanish Segunda División club Badajoz, making two league appearances in his single season at the club. In 1997, Bubista joined Angolan club ASA. Bubista played for ASA for six seasons, before returning to his native Cape Verde, joining Falcões do Norte in 2003.

International career
In 1991, Bubista made his debut for Cape Verde. Bubista later captained the country, making 28 appearances for Cape Verde during his career.

Managerial career
Following his playing career, Bubista managed domestic Cape Verdean clubs Mindelense, Académica do Mindelo, Sporting Clube da Praia and Batuque. In January 2020, he was named manager of Cape Verde.

References

1970 births
Living people
Cape Verdean footballers
Association football defenders
Cape Verde international footballers
CD Badajoz players
Atlético Sport Aviação players
Sporting Clube da Praia football managers
Cape Verde national football team managers
Cape Verdean expatriate footballers
Expatriate footballers in Spain
Expatriate footballers in Angola
Cape Verdean football managers
Segunda División players